A sextuple bond is a type of covalent bond involving 12 bonding electrons and in which the bond order is 6.

Theoretical analysis 
Roos et al argue that no stable element can form bonds of higher order than a sextuple bond, because the latter corresponds to a hybrid of the s orbital and all five d orbitals, and f orbitals contract too close to the nucleus to bond in the lanthan­ides.  Indeed, quantum mechanical calculations have revealed that the di­molybdenum bond is formed by a combination of two σ bonds, two π bonds and two δ bonds.  (Also, the σ and π bonds contribute much more significantly to the sextuple bond than the δ bonds.) 

Although no φ bonding has been reported for transition metal dimers, it is predicted that if any sextuply-bonded actinides were to exist, at least one of the bonds would likely be a φ bond as in quintuply-bonded diuranium and di­neptunium. No sextuple bond has been observed in lanthanides or actinides.  

For the majority of elements, even the possibility of a sextuple bond is foreclosed, because the d electrons ferromagnetically couple, instead of bonding.  The only known exceptions are dimolybdenum and ditungsten.

Quantum-mechanical treatment 
The formal bond order of a molecule is half the number of bonding electrons surplus to antibonding electrons; for a typical molecule, it attains exclusively integer values. A full quantum treatment requires a more nuanced picture, in which electrons may exist in a superposition, contributing fractionally to both bonding and antibonding orbitals.  In a formal sextuple bond, there would be  different electron pairs; an effective sextuple bond would then have all six contributing almost entirely to bonding orbitals.  

Several metal-metal bonds' EBOs are given in the table at right, compared to their formal bond orders.   

Dimolybdenum and ditungsten are the only mole­cules with effective bond orders above 5, with a quintuple bond and a partially formed sixth covalent bond. Dichromium, while formally described as having a sextuple bond, is best described as a pair of chromium atoms with all electron spins exchange-coupled to each other.  

While diuranium is also formally described as having a sextuple bond, relativistic quantum mechanical calculations have determined it to be a quadruple bond with four electrons ferro­magnetically coupled to each other rather than in two formal bonds. Previous calcu­lations on diuranium did not treat the electronic molecular Hamiltonian relativistically and produced higher bond orders of 4.2 with two ferromagnetically coupled electrons.

Known instances: dimolybdenum and ditungsten 
Laser evaporation of a molybdenum sheet at low temperatures (7 K) produces gaseous dimolybdenum (Mo2).  The resulting molecules can then be imaged with, for instance, near-infrared spectroscopy or UV spectroscopy. 

Both ditungsten and dimolybdenum have very short bond lengths compared to neighboring metal dimers.  For example, sextuply-bonded dimolybdenum has an equilibrium bond length of 1.93 Å. This equi­librium internuclear distance is signi­ficantly lower than in the dimer of any neighboring 4d transition metal, and sug­gestive of higher bond orders.  However, the bond dissociation energies of ditungsten and dimolybdenum are rather low, because the short internuclear distance introduces geometric strain. 

One empirical technique to determine bond order is spectroscopic exami­nation of bond force constants.

The table at right shows some select force constants for metal-metal dimers com­pared to their EBOs; consistent with a sextuple bond, molybdenum's summed force constant is substantially more than quintuple the single-bond force constant.  

Like dichromium, dimolybdenum and ditungsten are expected to exhibit a 1Σg+ singlet ground state.  However, in tungsten, this ground state arises from a hybrid of either two 5D0 ground states or two 7S3 excited states. Only the latter corresponds to the formation of a stable, sextuply-bonded ditungsten dimer.

Ligand effects 
Although sextuple bonding in homodimers is rare, it remains a possibility in larger molecules.

Aromatics 
Theoretical computations suggest that bent dimetallocenes have a higher bond order than their linear counterparts.  For this reason, the Schaefer lab has investi­gated dimetallocenes for natural sextuple bonds.  However, such com­pounds tend to exhibit Jahn-Teller distortion, rather than a true sextuple bond.  

For example, dirhenocene is bent. Calculating its frontier molecular orbitals sug­gests the existence of relatively stable singlet and triplet states, with a sextuple bond in the singlet state. But that state is the excited one; the triplet ground state should exhibit a formal pentuple bond. Similarly, for the dibenzene complexes Cr2(C6H6)2, Mo2(C6H6)2, and W2(C6H6)2, molecular bonding orbitals for the triplet states with symmetries D6h and D6d indicate the possibility of an intermetallic sex­tuple bond.

Oxo ligands 
Both quantum mechanical calculations and photoelectron spectroscopy of the tungsten oxide clusters W2On (n = 1-6) indicate that increased oxidation state reduces the bond order in ditungsten.  At first, the weak δ bonds break to yield a quadruply-bonded W2O; further oxidation generates the ditungsten complex W2O6 with two bridging oxo ligands and no direct W-W bonds.

References

Further reading

Chemical bonding